This is a list of the weekly Canadian RPM magazine number one Top Singles chart of 1977.

See also
1977 in music

List of Billboard Hot 100 number ones of 1977
List of Cashbox Top 100 number-one singles of 1977

References
Notes

External links
 Search RPM charts here at Library and Archives Canada

 
1977 record charts
1977